Tadeusz Piguła (born 10 August 1952) is a Polish fencer. He competed at the 1980 and 1988 Summer Olympics.

References

1952 births
Living people
Polish male fencers
Olympic fencers of Poland
Fencers at the 1980 Summer Olympics
Fencers at the 1988 Summer Olympics
People from Konin
Sportspeople from Greater Poland Voivodeship